Hanne Krogh (born 24 January 1956) is a Norwegian singer and actress from Haugesund and Oslo. Krogh is among the most selling record artists in Norway ever and is internationally well known for winning the Eurovision Song Contest 1985 with Elisabeth Andreassen in the group Bobbysocks!.

Personal life 
She is the mother of television presenter Sverre Krogh Sundbø  and actress Amalie Krogh.

Career 
She officially started singing when she was 9 years old, and released her first album when she was 14.
She represented Norway with the song "Lykken er" in the 1971 Eurovision Song Contest.
She has received major acclaim through Norwegian awards. Among them are numerous Spellemann (Norwegian Grammy) including the Honorary Award, and the Peer Gynt Prize, which is awarded by members of the Parliament to those Norwegians who have done the most to gain Norway's reputation abroad. In addition to her own projects, she is also frequently asked to act as MC at conventions, often in relation to female entrepreneurship.

In 2012, she toured Norway with two major sold-out shows that she had written and directed. She also made numerous television appearances. In 2013, Hanne decided to mark the 100-year anniversary of women's suffrage in Norway by focusing toward violence against women, and brought to light of unknown admirable women. This also included recording a new studio album Ikke gi deg, jente.

In 2015, her new-written show "World of Music" gained another standing ovation, both from the audience and from the critics.

Krogh has released 27 albums, including a compilation, Hanne Krogh: 40 beste in 1994, and many other singles.

Discography

Solo albums
 Hanne Krogh (1978)
 Nærbilde (1980)
 Alene (1982)
 Nordens vakreste (1982)
 Under samme sol (1983)
 Julens vakreste (1983)
 Hanne (1989)
 Ta meg til havet (1992)
 40 beste (1994)
 Prøysens barnesanger (1995)
 Julestjerner (1996)
 Reisen til den levende parken (1997)
 Vestavind (1998)
 Egners barnesanger (1999)
 God jul – Hannes beste julesanger (2000)
 Sanger fra barnas skattkammer (2002)
 Ved juletid (2002)
 God jul – Hannes beste julesanger (rerelease) (2006)
 Barnas nasjonalskatt (2012)
 Ikke gi deg, jente (2013)

Bobbysocks! albums
 Bobbysocks (1984/85)
 Waiting for the Morning (1986)
 Walkin' on Air (1987)
 Let It Swing – The Best of Bobbysocks (2010)

Just4Fun albums
 Ren 60 (1990/91)
 Those Were the Days (1991)

Hanne & Tre Tenorer albums
 Vår julekonsert (2011)

Filmography
Krogh participated as an actress in these movies:
 1974: Crash as Marianne
 1976: Reisen til julestjernen as Sonja

See also
 Eurovision Song Contest 1971
 Eurovision Song Contest 1985
 Eurovision Song Contest 1991
 Melodi Grand Prix
 Bobbysocks!
 Congratulations (Eurovision)
 Europride
 Elisabeth Andreassen

References

External links

 Official website
 Full discography
 

1956 births
Living people
Eurovision Song Contest winners
Melodi Grand Prix contestants
Eurovision Song Contest entrants for Norway
Eurovision Song Contest entrants of 1971
Eurovision Song Contest entrants of 1985
Eurovision Song Contest entrants of 1991
Norwegian women singers
Norwegian Christians
Melodi Grand Prix winners
People from Haugesund
Bobbysocks! members